Adampur, also Mandi Adampur, is a town, municipality, revenue tehsil, rural development block and Vidhan Sabha constituency in Hisar district of Hisar division of Haryana state in northern India. It is 38 km northwest of Hisar city.

Administration and economy

Adampur has several government offices including BDO and municipality office, police stations, 132 KV electricity substation, agriculture marketing committee, market committee, farmer's rest house, women ad child welfare office, block agriculture office, PWD office, 3 water purification plants, railway station, bus stand, civil hospital, telephone exchange, post office, gas agency, 10 petrol stations, several banks, oil and cotton factories, etc.

Politics

It is part of Adampur, Haryana Assembly constituency and Hisar Lok Sabha constituency.

Education

 Colleges
 Feroze Gandhi Memorial Post Graduate College, Adampur-Bhadra road. 
 Government Polytechnic College, Mandi Adampur 
 Maharaja Agrasain College, Daroli

 Schools
 Adarsh High School, Adampur. 
 Arya High School, Kalirawan, Mandi Adampur. 
 Bal Bharti High School, Mandi Adampur
 Government Girl's Sr. Secondary School, Mandi Adampur
 Government Model Sr. Secondary School, Adampur
 Guru Dronacharya Girl's College, Mandi adampur
 Guru Dronacharya International School, Adampur
 Guru Jambheshwar Sr.Secondary School, Mandi Adampur
 Mother's Pride Convent School, Mandi Adampur 
 Northern International School Mandi Adampur
 Shanti Niketan Public School, Adampur
 Shree Peepasar Sr Sec School, Sadalpur, Mandi Adampur 
 Shri Krishna Parnami Sr. Secondary School, Mandi Adampur
 V.M.Vishvas School, Khara Barwala Road, Mandi Adampur, Hisar

Notable people

Subhash Chandra
Bhajan Lal

See also
 Adampur in Amritsar district in Punjab

References

Villages in Hisar district